Susana Moreira Marques (born 20 August 1976) is a Portuguese journalist and author.

She has a degree in Communication Studies from the NOVA University of Lisbon has worked as a journalist for Público and Jornal de Negócios.

Her first book, Now and at the Hour of our Death, was published in 2013 and is about a project of the Calouste Gulbenkian Foundation of palliative care for the terminally ill.  The book was released in English by And Other Stories in 2015.

She currently resides in Lisbon.

Published works 

 (2015) Now and at the Hour of our Death. And Other Stories, UK.

Awards 

 2012 - Journalism Prize Human Rights and Integration (UNESCO)
 2012 - Journalism Against Indifference (AMI)

References

1976 births
Living people
People from Porto
Portuguese women writers
Portuguese women journalists
NOVA University Lisbon alumni